Chathenkary  is a village in Upper Kuttanadu division Pathanamthitta district in the state of Kerala, India.

Chathenkari is a small village / hamlet in Kuttanadu. It is under the Upper Kuttanadu division. It is situated in Thiruvalla Taluk in Pathanamthitta District of Kerala state, India. It is under Peringara Panchayath. It belongs to South Kerala Division. It is located 36 km west towards the District headquarters Pathanamthitta, 6 km from Thiruvalla and 128 km from State capital Thiruvananthapuram.

Worship centres
St Paul's Mar Thoma Church
Chathenkary Sri Bhagavathi Temple
St. Mathew's marthoma church
St Joseph Chapel Chathenkary
St. Mary's Malankara Catholic Church
Sharon Fellowship church
Chathenkary Sree Ardhanareeshwara Temple

Schools
Govt LP School
Govt New LP School
SNDP High School, Chathenkary

Politics
The Indian National Congress, the CPIM, the JD(S) and the Kerala Congress(M) are the major political parties in this area.

Hospitals
 Manak Hospital, Chathenkary mukku
 Primary Health Centre, Chathenkary

Notable people 
Mammen Mathai

Nearby places
Mepral
Muttar
Neerattupuram
Peringara
Nedumpuram
Podiyadi
Kavumbhagam
Amichakery

Transport

Bus
Private and KSRTC bus available from Chathenkary junction to other parts of Kerala.

Railway
Thiruvalla railway station is near station to Chathenkary.

Air
Cochin International Airport Nedumbassery is 115 km away from Chathenkary.

References

Villages in Pathanamthitta district